Way Back Home: Live from New York City is a live album by The Wreckers. It is their second release and it was released on December 4, 2007 by Warner Bros. Records. The release also features a DVD capturing the live concert. This album consists mostly of live rendition of the hits which appear on their debut album, Stand Still, Look Pretty, as well as two new songs ("Damn That Radio" and "Different Truck, Same Loser") and a cover of a Michelle Branch original, "Love Me Like That". This album was the duo's final release, before they separated to focus on solo careers.

Track listing

References

The Wreckers albums
2007 live albums
Maverick Records live albums